The 1993 World Orienteering Championships, the 15th World Orienteering Championships, were held in West Point, New York, United States, 9–14 October 1993.

The championships had six events; the classic distance (formerly called individual) for men and women, the short distance for men and women, and relays for men and women.

Medalists

References 

World Orienteering Championships
1993 in sports in New York (state)
International sports competitions hosted by the United States
October 1993 sports events in the United States
Orienteering in the United States
International sports competitions in New York (state)